Nijaz Merdanović (born 15 January 1957) is a Bosnian retired professional footballer and current marketing director of the Football Association of Bosnia and Herzegovina.

Playing career
At the time considered one of Yugoslavia's biggest footballing talents, Merdanić debuted for Sarajevo at the age of 16, becoming the youngest player in the history of the club to appear in a senior league game. A chronic knee injury that resulted in three separate operations would end his playing career at the age of only 27.

Administrative career
After retiring from football, Merdanić was named as Sarajevo's General Secretary, and would eventually go on to become the 33rd President of the club Assembly, staying on that position from September 2005 until June 2010. He is the current marketing director of the Football Association of Bosnia and Herzegovina.

Personal life
Nijaz's younger brother Senad also played for Sarajevo.

References

1957 births
Living people
People from Kakanj
Bosniaks of Bosnia and Herzegovina
Association football wingers
Yugoslav footballers
FK Sarajevo players
Yugoslav First League players
FK Sarajevo presidents of the assembly